The 1986 Southern Illinois Salukis football team was an American football team that represented Southern Illinois University (now known as Southern Illinois University Carbondale) in the Gateway Collegiate Athletic Conference (GCAC) during the 1986 NCAA Division I-AA football season.  Under third-year head coach Ray Dorr, the team compiled a 7–4 record (4–2 against conference opponents). The team played its home games at McAndrew Stadium in Carbondale, Illinois.

Schedule

References

Southern Illinois
Southern Illinois Salukis football seasons
Southern Illinois Salukis football